The American Unitarian Conference (AUC) is a religious organization and a missionary and publication society which serves the needs of individual Unitarian believers. It was founded in 2000 by several Unitarian Universalists who felt that the Unitarian Universalist Association (UUA) had become too theologically liberal and too political. They decided their mission was to promote classical Unitarianism, which they argued as being based on Christian beliefs though not solely confined by them. They also hoped their organization would be of interest to non-Christians who embrace generic or philosophical theism and Deism.

Unitarianism as understood within the AUC has as a main tenet the belief in God as one person as opposed to trinitarianism which holds to the belief in a God of three persons. Among the classical Unitarian principles that the AUC promotes are the unity and providence of God, the compatibility of faith and reason, and the ability of religion and science to work together to improve the human condition.

In classical Unitarian fashion, the AUC does not require adherence to a creed to become a member. All who are in agreement with the AUC's religious principles, regardless of denominational affiliation or lack thereof, may join. The AUC does not exclude non-Christians, but many if not most of its members are Unitarian Christians.

The AUC does not engage in political activism or release political statements except in cases that involve religious freedom and church/state separation.

The AUC is run by volunteers. Their motto is "Faith, Freedom, Reason."

Footnotes

External links
American Unitarian Conference (official website)

Christian organizations established in 2000
Unitarianism
Nontrinitarian denominations